Events in the year 1531 in Portugal.

Incumbents
King of Portugal and the Algarves: John III

Events

26 January – The Lisbon earthquake and subsequent tsunami resulted in approximately 30,000 deaths.

Births
11 November – Manuel, Prince of Portugal (died 1537)

Full date missing
António, Prior of Crato,  King of Portugal as António I of Portugal for 33 days in 1580 (died 1595)

Deaths

Full date missing
Diogo de Arruda, architect (born before 1490)
María Pacheco, Spanish woman who escaped to Portugal when her husband Juan López de Padilla was killed in 1521 (born about 1496)

See also
History of Portugal (1415–1578)

References

 
Years of the 16th century in Portugal
Portugal